Yeniarx may refer to:
Yeniarx, Agdash, Azerbaijan
Yeniarx, Aşağı Zeynəddin, Azerbaijan
Yeniarx, Qobuüstü, Azerbaijan
Yeniarx, Goychay, Azerbaijan